List of universities, colleges & schools in Vellore city and its suburbs.

Universities 
 Vellore Institute of Technology University
 Thiruvalluvar University

Islamic Institutions 
 Baqiyat Salihat Arabic College
 Madrasa e Rasheediya
 Madrasa e latifiya

Medical colleges 
 Christian Medical College and Hospital
 Government Vellore Medical College
 Sri Narayani College & School of Nursing
 Schieffelin institute of health in karigiri

Engineering colleges 
 Thanthai Periyar Government Institute of Technology
 Kingston Engineering College

Arts and science colleges 
 Voorhees College
 Muthurangam Govt. Arts College
 Auxilium College
 D.K.M College for Women

Law college 

 Government Law College, Vellore

Polytechnics 

 Thanthai periyar E.V.Ramasamy Government Polytechnic
 Nettur Technical Training Foundation (NTTF), Katpadi
 Sri Venkateshwara Polytechnic College  Adukambarai

Industrial training institute 

 Government I.T.I, Vellore
Vellore Advanced Studies

Schools 

 Sunbeam Senior Secondary School
 Sunbeam Matric Higher Secondary School
  Shrishti Vidyashram Senior Secondary School
 Shrishti Matriculation Higher Secondary School.
 Spring days CBSE school
 Government Muslim Higher Secondary School
 EV Ramasamy Girls Higher Secondary School
 Ida Scudder school, ICSE, Vellore
 Lakshmi Garden Higher Secondary School
 Shri Vardhaman Jain Matric Higher Secondary school
 Sri Venkateswara Higher Secondary School
 don bosco matric hr sec school

References 

Vellore
Vellore
Education in Vellore
Vellore